Wilfred David "Mick" Borrie  (2 September 1913 – 1 January 2000) was a New Zealand-born Australian demographer and academic.

Education
Borrie was educated at Waitaki Boys' High School, Oamaru, completing his education at the University of Otago and University of Cambridge.His Master's thesis The military defence of New Zealand, 1850–1914, was completed at Otago in 1936. 
Borrie was president of the Otago University Students' Association in 1936.

Career
Borrie moved to Sydney in 1941 where he taught Social History at the University of Sydney until 1947.

Borrie joined the Australian National University in 1948. Borrie founded the Department of Demography in 1952, where from 1957 he was Professor of Demography and Chair of Demography, the first such worldwide. He retired in 1978.

In 1961, Borrie delivered the third in the annual series of ABC lectures (renamed the Boyer Lectures) on "The Crowding World".

Borrie, keen to extend population studies throughout Australia, encouraged the formation of the Australian Population Association (APA) in 1980. Borrie remained patron of the APA until he died.

Personal
Borrie was born on 2 September 1913 at Waimate, New Zealand, the son of Peter William Borrie and Isabella Doig.
Borrie married Alice Hazel Muller in 1941, and had one daughter. He died on 1 January 2000.

Honours and awards
 1950 Elected Fellow of the Academy of the Social Sciences in Australia
 1969 Officer of the Order of the British Empire for service to social science.
 1975 Honorary degree of Doctor of Science, University of Tasmania
 1979 Commander of the Order of the British Empire for service to social science.
 1979 Honorary degree of Doctor of Science in Economics, University of Sydney
 1996 IUSSP Laureate.

Memorials and legacy

Borrie Prize
"The W.D. Borrie Prize is awarded to the best student paper on a population-related topic".

References

1913 births
2000 deaths
Alumni of the University of Cambridge
Australian demographers
Australian Commanders of the Order of the British Empire
Australian Officers of the Order of the British Empire
University of Otago alumni
Academic staff of the Australian National University
Fellows of the Academy of the Social Sciences in Australia
New Zealand emigrants to Australia
New Zealand demographers